Kamamoto (written:  or ) is a Japanese surname. Notable people with the surname include:

, Japanese hammer thrower
, Japanese baseball player
, Japanese footballer and manager

Japanese-language surnames